Muslim Jamaath is a Kerala based Islamic organization In India, under the supervision of the All India Sunni Jamiyyathul Ulama. This body acts as an apex body of various other organization and institutions which were following the ideologies of samastha Kerala Jamiyyathul Ulama

It includes various state level Organizations such as Bombay Muslim Jamaath In Mumbai India It also includes the Malabar Muslim Jamaat

Party's ideology and mission 
"This is not a political party. We will not take any direct political role. Other than politics, we have lots of things to do for society. All should contribute for nation building," Muslim Jamaat leader Sheikh Abubakr Ahmad said when he announced the launch of the Kerala Muslim Jamaath in Malappuram Municipal Town Hall on 10 October 2015.
Grand Mufti of India and a social activist, Sheikh Abubakr Ahmad has been elected as the President of the Kerala Muslim Jamaat. He also often says that education is the most powerful weapon in the fight against terrorism and was the first religious Muslim leader in India to issue a fatwa (religious decree) against the terror group Daesh.

The organization rejects the Islamic extremism Jamat was in the broadcast regarding its strong opposes to the Indian Prime Minister Narendra Modi with citizen amendment act

In an act of communal amity, the Cheravally Muslim Jamaath Committee, Kayamkulam, on January 19 hosted a Hindu marriage on the mosque premises.

The origin of the term Jamaat is from the Arabic language: جماعتِ (meaning assembly).

Programmes
 In January 19th 2022, the Kerala Muslim Jamath organized a conference in the city of Malappuram,Kerala to explain and promote the Sunni Islamic ideology against Salafism. During the conference, the organizers criticized the Salafy ideology and highlighted the problems they believe it poses. The conference drew a large crowd of attendees and received significant media coverage in the region.
 The Organization has publicly opposed the state government's revenue recovery procedures. The organization claims that the government's actions, which were ordered by the Kerala High Court, have targeted non-members of the Popular Front of India (PFI) and are a mistake. The Jamath argues that the government's actions are unjust and have caused financial hardships for innocent individuals. The organization has called for the government to review its policy and for the release of those who have been falsely accused.

References

External links

 
Organisations based in Kerala
Arabic words and phrases
Muslim communities of India
Islamic organisations based in India
All India Sunni Jamiyyathul Ulama
Islamic organizations established in 2015
2015 establishments in Kerala